Mesorhizobium plurifarium is a species of root nodule bacteria first isolated from Acacia species in Senegal. Its type strain is ORS 1032 (= LMG 11892).

References

Further reading

External links

LPSN
Type strain of Mesorhizobium plurifarium at BacDive -  the Bacterial Diversity Metadatabase

Phyllobacteriaceae
Bacteria described in 1998